A. terrestris may refer to:

 Actinochloris terrestris, an alga species
 Arvicola terrestris, the European Water Vole, a mammal species

See also
 Terrestris